Cyperus clavinux is a species of sedge that is endemic to parts of Africa.

The species was first formally described by the botanist Charles Baron Clarke in 1901.

See also
 List of Cyperus species

References

clavinux
Taxa named by Charles Baron Clarke
Plants described in 1901
Flora of Zimbabwe
Flora of Zambia
Flora of Botswana
Flora of Chad
Flora of Malawi
Flora of Tanzania